Clifford Frank de Grey (20 May 1918 – 16 March 2007), better known as Slim De Grey, was an English-Australian actor, compere, musician, lyricist, composer and comedian.

He served in the Australian Army during World War II, seeing action in the Malayan campaign with the 2/10th Field Ambulance, part of the 8th Division of the Second Australian Imperial Force. He became a POW at the fall of Singapore on 15 February 1942 and was imprisoned in Changi Prison until the end of the war. While at Changi he composed, presented and produced shows.

His television roles included Young Ramsay, Bellamy and Skippy the Bush Kangaroo.

He was married to Christina de Grey and they had two sons: Calvin, an actor (1957-2008); and Darrell. He was inducted into the Hall of Fame of the Mo Awards.

Select film credits
They're a Weird Mob (1966)
Wake in Fright (1971)
Stone (1974) 
Newsfront (1978)
Crocodile Dundee in Los Angeles (2001)
 Changi (2001-TV mini-series)

Awards

Mo Awards
The Australian Entertainment Mo Awards (commonly known informally as the Mo Awards), were annual Australian entertainment industry awards. They recognise achievements in live entertainment in Australia from 1975 to 2016. Slim De Grey won four awards in that time.
 (wins only)
|-
| 1975
| Slim De Grey
| Comedian of the Year
| 
|-
| 1976
| Slim De Grey
| Comedian of the Year
| 
|-
| 1978
| Slim De Grey
| Comedian of the Year
| 
|-
| 2006
| Slim De Grey
| Hall of Fame
| 
|-

References

External links

Slim De Grey at Ausstage

Australian male film actors
Australian male comedians
1918 births
2007 deaths
20th-century Australian comedians
Australian Army personnel of World War II
Australian prisoners of war
World War II prisoners of war held by Japan
British emigrants to Australia